The Colombo Kings (abbreviated as CK) is a franchise Twenty20 cricket team based in Colombo, Western Province, Sri Lanka, that competed in the inaugural Lanka Premier League in 2020. The team is owned by Murfad Mustafa, an Indian businessman based in Dubai. For the season, the team was coached by Rangana Herath. Angelo Mathews served as captain, and was also announced as the icon player. Andre Russell, a Jamaican, was named as the marquee foreign player in the inaugural season. English batsman Laurie Evans made the most runs, while Afghan bowler Qais Ahmad took the most wickets for the Lanka's league.

The team was the most successful team of the season, winning six out of eight matches, though they lost in the semi-final against Galle Gladiators.

Season summary
The Kings defeated the Kandy Tuskers in the league's inaugural match. The Tuskers scored 219/3 with the help of captain Kusal Mendis, who scored 87 runs off 52 balls. The Kings also scored 219 runs, which meant the game went to a super over. In the super over, the Tuskers scored 12/0 runs in reply to 16/1 runs by the Kings.

In Game 2, against the Galle Gladiators, the match was reduced to 5 overs per side because of rain. Andre Russell scored 65 runs off 19 balls to propel the Kings to 96 runs, while Galle could muster only 62 runs in response. The Kings' batting fluctuated in Game 3 as they were bowled out for just 149 runs in response to the 175 runs by Dambulla Viiking. With this loss, the Kings' unbeaten winning run came to an end.

In the Game 4, the team's bowlers restricted the Jaffna Stallions to 148/9. The Stallions' Wanindu Hasaranga scored 41 runs off 23 balls. The Kings chased the total down, winning the game by six wickets.

In Game 5, the Kings' Qais Ahmed picked up 2 wickets while also conceding eight runs from his four overs. The Kings bowled out the Tuskers for just 105 runs. In response, the Kings chased the total down inside of 15 overs to win the match by seven wickets. In Game 6, the Kings faced the Gladiators for the second time in the season. The Kings were bowled out for 175 runs, with Pakistani bowler Mohammed Amir taking a fifer. The Kings bowlers failed to defend their total, as they lost the game by eight wickets.

In Game 7 against the Stallions, the Colombo Kings batted first, with their opener Laurie Evans scoring 108 runs off 65 balls. This was also the LPL's first-ever century, and it helped lift the Kings to another win. In the last game of the group stage, Ahmed performed with both bat and ball. He first took 2-23 wickets from his four overs before hitting 50 runs off 22 balls. This gave the Kings another win, and they finished first on the table.

In the semi-final, the Kings opposed the Gladiators. They were impeccable with the bowling, the pace trio of Amir, Nuwan Thushara, and Dhananjaya Lakshan giving away just 80 runs in 12 overs, and picking up four wickets. However, with the batting, the Gladiators had enough opportunity to steal the win from Kings. When the game reached its final over, the Gladiators needed 15 off 6 balls. Lakshan struck two sixes, and Lakshan Sandakan later concluded the game by striking a four, giving the Kings the loss.

Squad

Administration and support staff

Teams and standings

Points table

Matches

Statistics

Most runs

Most wickets

Awards and achievements

References

2020 Lanka Premier League